Marion County is one of the 36 counties in the U.S. state of Oregon. The population was 345,920 at the 2020 census, making it the fifth-most populous county in Oregon. The county seat is Salem, which is also the state capital of Oregon. The county was originally named the Champooick District, after Champoeg (earlier Champooick), a meeting place on the Willamette River. On September 3, 1849, the territorial legislature renamed it in honor of Francis Marion, a Continental Army general from South Carolina who served in the American Revolutionary War.

Marion County is part of the Salem, OR Metropolitan Statistical Area, which is also included in the Portland-Vancouver-Salem, OR-WA Combined Statistical Area. It is located in the Willamette Valley.

History
Marion County was created by the Provisional Legislature of Oregon on July 5, 1843, as the Champooick District, one of the original four districts of the Oregon Country along with Twality (later Washington), Clackamas, and Yamhill counties. The four districts were redesignated as counties in 1845.

Originally, this political entity stretched southward to the California border and eastward to the Rocky Mountains. With the creation of Wasco, Linn, Polk, and other counties, its area was reduced in size. Marion County's present geographical boundaries were established in 1856.

In 1849, Salem was designated the county seat. The territorial capital was moved from Oregon City to Salem in 1852. The ensuing controversy over the location of the capital was settled in 1864 when Salem was confirmed as the state capital.

Geography

Adjacent counties
 Yamhill County (northwest)
 Clackamas County (north)
 Wasco County (northeast)
 Jefferson County (east)
 Linn County (south)
 Polk County (west)

National protected areas
Ankeny National Wildlife Refuge
Mount Hood National Forest (part)
Willamette National Forest (part)

Demographics

2000 census
As of the census of 2000, there were 284,834 people, 101,641 households, and 70,437 families living in the county.  The population density was 241 people per square mile (93/km2).  There were 108,174 housing units at an average density of 91 per square mile (35/km2).  The racial makeup of the county was 81.62% White, 0.89% Black or African American, 1.44% Native American, 1.75% Asian, 0.36% Pacific Islander, 10.58% from other races, and 3.35% from two or more races. 17.10% of the population were Hispanic or Latino of any race. 18.4% were of German, 9.2% English, 8.2% American and 7.4% Irish ancestry. 80.8% spoke English, 14.8% Spanish and 1.4% Russian as their first language.

There were 101,641 households, out of which 34.50% had children under the age of 18 living with them, 53.70% were married couples living together, 11.00% had a female householder with no husband present, and 30.70% were non-families. 24.00% of all households were made up of individuals, and 9.50% had someone living alone who was 65 years of age or older.  The average household size was 2.70 and the average family size was 3.19.

In the county, the population was spread out, with 27.40% under the age of 18, 10.30% from 18 to 24, 28.70% from 25 to 44, 21.20% from 45 to 64, and 12.40% who were 65 years of age or older.  The median age was 34 years. For every 100 females, there were 101.10 males.  For every 100 females age 18 and over, there were 99.50 males.

The median income for a household  in the county was $40,314, and the median income for a family was $46,202. Males had a median income of $33,841 versus $26,283 for females. The per capita income for the county was $18,408.  About 9.60% of families and 13.50% of the population were below the poverty line, including 18.10% of those under age 18 and 7.40% of those age 65 or over.

2010 census
As of the 2010 census, there were 315,335 people, 112,957 households, and 77,044 families living in the county. The racial makeup of the county was 78.2% white, 1.9% Asian, 1.6% American Indian, 1.1% black or African American, 0.7% Pacific islander, 12.6% from other races, and 3.9% from two or more races. Those of Hispanic or Latino origin made up 24.3% of the population. In terms of ancestry, 22.1% were German, 11.4% were English, 11.0% were Irish, and 4.7% were American.

Of the 112,957 households, 35.5% had children under the age of 18 living with them, 50.4% were married couples living together, 12.4% had a female householder with no husband present, 31.8% were non-families, and 25.0% of all households were made up of individuals. The average household size was 2.70 and the average family size was 3.23. The median age was 35.1 years.

The median income for a household in the county was $46,069 and the median income for a family was $54,661. Males had a median income of $39,239 versus $32,288 for females. The per capita income for the county was $21,915. About 11.7% of families and 16.0% of the population were below the poverty line, including 23.8% of those under age 18 and 7.6% of those age 65 or over.

2020 Census
The racial make up of the county was 61.8% non-Hispanic white, 1.1% African American, .9% Native American, 2.1% Asian, 4.9% of two or more races, and 27.7% Hispanic.

Law and government

Elected officials
Marion County is among the 24 of Oregon's 36 counties that operate under a board of commissioners (BOC) of three members elected countywide to 4-year terms.  In Marion County these are partisan races. Commissioners, who are full-time, salaried officials, have executive, legislative, and quasi-judicial powers (the latter in land-use cases). The Board of Commissioners serves as the governing body. The commissioners elect their chair annually; in practice, in Marion County the chair rotates annually.  The BOC is responsible for accepting funds from sources outside the county, strategic planning, and enacting ordinances as needed to carry out plans and serve the public. The BOC also prepares a county budget in cooperation with the elected heads of the various departments. The BOC is required by law to appoint a Budget Officer who presents a budget to the Budget Committee composed of the Commissioners and three public members. County commissioners appoint and oversee non-elected department heads, officers, boards, and commissions. 

In addition to the Board of Commissioners, the county has non-partisan positions that are elected in county-wide elections for four year terms: Assessor, Clerk, Treasurer, District Attorney, Sheriff, and Justices of the Peace. These officers are not accountable to the Board of Commissioners, although they work with the commissioners in establishing a county budget. All are full-time, paid county officers.

Politics
Although Democrats took the presidential vote with pluralities in 1996, 2008, and 2020, no Democrat has carried a majority of the county since Lyndon Johnson in 1964. Marion County is one of 13 counties to have voted for Barack Obama in 2008, Mitt Romney in 2012, Donald Trump in 2016, and Joe Biden in 2020.

Economy
Agriculture and food processing are important to the county's economy, as are lumber, manufacturing, and education. Marion County is the leader in agricultural production among all other Oregon counties. Marion County has 10,640 acres (43 km2) planted in orchards. The marionberry was named after the county.  Government, however, is the county's main employer and economic base.

Education

Tertiary education
Marion County is the home of Willamette University, Corban University, and Chemeketa Community College. All of Marion County is within the Chemeketa community college district.

K-12 schools
Public K-12 school districts include:
 Cascade School District 5
 Central School District 13J
 Gervais School District 1
 Jefferson School District 14J
 Mount Angel School District 91
 North Marion School District 15
 North Santiam School District 29J
 Salem-Keizer School District 24J
 Santiam Canyon School District 129J
 Silver Falls School District 4J
 St. Paul School District 45
 Woodburn School District

State-operated schools:
 Oregon School for the Deaf
The Oregon School for the Blind closed in 2009.

Bureau of Indian Education-affiliated tribal school:
 Chemawa Indian School

Communities

Cities

Aumsville
Aurora
Detroit
Donald
Gates (part)
Gervais
Hubbard
Idanha (part)
Jefferson
Keizer
Mill City (part)
Mt. Angel
St. Paul
Salem (county seat)
Scotts Mills
Silverton
Stayton
Sublimity
Turner
Woodburn

Census-designated places
Brooks
Butteville
Four Corners
Hayesville
Labish Village
Marion
Mehama

Unincorporated communities

Breitenbush
Champoeg
Chemawa
Clear Lake
Macleay
McKee
Middle Grove
Monitor
Niagara
North Howell
Pratum
Rosedale
Saint Benedict
Saint Louis
Shaw
Talbot
Waconda
West Stayton

See also
National Register of Historic Places listings in Marion County, Oregon

Notes

References

Further reading
 H.O. Lang (ed.), History of the Willamette Valley: Being a Description of the Valley and its Resources, with an Account of its Discovery and Settlement by White Men, and its Subsequent History; Together with Personal Reminiscences of its Early Pioneers. Portland: Himes and Lang, 1885.
 Portrait and Biographical Record of the Willamette Valley, Oregon, Containing Original Sketches of Many Well Known Citizens of the Past and Present. Chicago: Chapman Publishing Co., 1903.
 Marion County Historical Society, Marion County History. (periodical)

 
1843 establishments in Oregon Country
Populated places established in 1843
Salem, Oregon metropolitan area